Spring Brook Cemetery is an historic cemetery on Spring Street in Mansfield, Massachusetts. The area appears to have been used as a cemetery before its formal establishment; there are a number of graves that predate 1850, the oldest of which is marked 1790. The most prominent structure in the cemetery is the Card Memorial Chapel, designed by Charles Eastman and built in 1898 with funding from Simon and Mary Card, in memory of their daughter Lulu.

The cemetery was listed on the National Register of Historic Places in 2007.

See also
 National Register of Historic Places listings in Bristol County, Massachusetts

References

External links
 

Cemeteries on the National Register of Historic Places in Massachusetts
Cemeteries in Bristol County, Massachusetts
Mansfield, Massachusetts
National Register of Historic Places in Bristol County, Massachusetts
Cemeteries established in the 1860s
1860 establishments in Massachusetts